Andrei Gennadyevich Ivanov (born 2 September 1994) is a Russian football player.

Club career
He made his professional debut in the Russian Professional Football League for FC Zenit-2 St. Petersburg on 15 July 2013 in a game against FC Tosno.

He made his Russian Football Premier League debut for FC Zenit St. Petersburg on 11 May 2016 in a game against FC Mordovia Saransk.

References

External links
 
 

1994 births
Footballers from Saint Petersburg
Living people
Russian footballers
Russia youth international footballers
Association football defenders
Russian expatriate footballers
Expatriate footballers in Belarus
FC Zenit Saint Petersburg players
Russian Premier League players
FC Mordovia Saransk players
FC Tom Tomsk players
FC Shinnik Yaroslavl players
FC Gomel players
FC Zenit-2 Saint Petersburg players
FC Olimp-Dolgoprudny players